Special Olympics Ireland is a sporting organisation for children and adults with intellectual disabilities that operates in the Island of Ireland. It is part of the global Special Olympics movement.

History
The organization was founded in 1978 by Eunice Kennedy Shriver to provide children and adults with a year-round sports program. The organisation was made up of 27,000 athletes. At the time, it was one of the first European programmes of the international Special Olympics movement.

Purpose 
Special Olympics Ireland creates opportunities for children and adults with learning (intellectual) disabilities to take part in various sports training and competition year-round. To be eligible to take part in the Special Olympics programmes, participants have to have an intellectual/learning disability.

Organisation 
In 2021, there were more than 8,000 Special Olympics athletes, aged 4 to 84, participating in 15 sports in 290 clubs throughout the island of Ireland. These athletes benefit from taking regular sport training and competition programmes.  It is broken up into five regions: Special Olympics Connaught, Special Olympics Leinster, Special Olympics Munster, Special Olympics Ulster and Special Olympics Eastern Region, which is for the Dublin Clubs.

Special Olympics Ireland Games
The Special Olympics Ireland Games are held every four years.

Editions

References

External links
 Official website

Special Olympics
Sports organisations of Ireland
Parasports organizations
Disability organisations based in the Republic of Ireland
Sports organizations established in 1978